Little Richard is a 2000 biographical NBC television film written by Bill Kerby and Daniel Taplitz and directed by Robert Townsend. Based on the 1984 book, Quasar of Rock: The Life and Times of Little Richard, it chronicles the rise of American musical icon Little Richard from his poor upbringing in Macon, Georgia to achieving superstardom as one of the pioneers of rock and roll music and his conflicts between his religion and secular lifestyle, which leads to an early retirement following a 1957 tour of Australia, and later a comeback to secular performing during a concert in London in 1962.

The cast includes Leon as Little Richard Penniman, Jenifer Lewis as Richard's mother Leva Mae, or as she's listed in the movie credits, Muh Penniman, Carl Lumbly as Richard's stern father, Charles "Bud" Penniman, Tamala Jones as Richard's girlfriend Lucille (actually Audrey Robinson), Garrett Morris as Richard's preacher Carl Rainey and Mel Jackson as producer Robert "Bumps" Blackwell.

For his role as Penniman, Leon earned nominations for Best Actor in the Black Reel Awards and the NAACP Image Awards.

Awards and nominations
 Black Reel Awards
Nominated (Network/Cable - Best Actor) - Leon
 NAACP Image Awards
Nominated (Outstanding Actor in a Television Movie, Mini-Series or Dramatic Special) - Leon
 Emmy Awards
Nominated (Outstanding Music Direction) - David Sibley

References

External links 
 

2000 films
American rock music films
2000s American television miniseries
African-American biographical dramas
2000s English-language films
Films based on biographies
Films directed by Robert Townsend
Films set in the 1930s
Films set in the 1940s
Films set in the 1950s
Films set in 1956
Films set in the 1960s
NBC original programming
American drama television films
2000s American films